WAWO (1400 AM) is a radio station licensed to Alma, Georgia, United States. The station is currently owned by Blueberry Broadcasting Company, Inc.

References

External links

AWO
Radio stations established in 1990